Carolyn Culliton (née DeMoney) is an American daytime radio and television writer. Born in Indiana, she graduated from Northwestern University. Her husband is fellow daytime serial writer Richard Culliton.

Positions held
All My Children
Breakdown Writer: 1992 - 1993

Another World
Head Writer: November 1994 - August 1995
Associate Head Writer: 1984 - 1985, 1986–1991, 1998 - June 25, 1999
Script Writer: 1985, 1998

Culltion's AW Team: November 1994 - August 1995; her writing team consisted of Sharon Epstein, Peter Brash, Elizabeth Page, Sofia Landon Geier, Janet Iacobuzio, Victor Miller, Samuel D. Ratcliffe, Craig Carlson, Judith Pinsker, Lorraine Broderick, Mimi Leahey, and Kathleen Kennedy.

As the World Turns
Co-Head Writer: 1999 - 2001
Associate Head Writer: October 2001 - October 2002, Spring 2004 - August 29, 2004

Days of Our Lives
Script Editor : 2010–present
Script Writer: February 22, 2010–present

General Hospital
Co-Head-Writer: 1997

Guiding Light
Head Writer: 1983
Co-Head Writer: November 2002 - September 12, 2003
Associate Head Writer: 1984, 1995, 2003

Loving
Associate Head Writer: 1995

One Life to Live
Script Writer: August 31, 2005 – November 15, 2007
Script Editor: October 2007 - February 7, 2008, April 23, 2008 – 2010)

Port Charles
Co-Head Writer: June 1, 1997 - December 1997

Sunset Beach
Script Writer: 1999

The City
Associate Head Writer: November 1995 - March 1997
Secretary to Paul Rauch in 1983

Awards and nominations
Daytime Emmy Awards

WINS
(2001, 2002 & 2005; Best Writing; As the World Turns)
(2008; Best Writing; One Life to Live)
(2012; Best Writing; Days of Our Lives)

NOMINATIONS 
(1985; Best Writing; Guiding Light)
(1985, 1989 & 1996; Best Writing; Another World)
(1993; Best Writing; All My Children)
(2000 & 2003; Best Writing; As the World Turns)
(2006 & 2009; Best Writing; One Life to Live)
(2011 & 2014; Best Writing; Days of Our Lives)

Writers Guild of America Award

WINS
(2014 season; Days of Our Lives)

NOMINATIONS 
(1985 season; Guiding Light)
(1994 season; All My Children)
(1995 & 1996 seasons; Another World)
(2006, 2009, 2010 & 2011 seasons; One Life to Live)
(2013 & 2015 seasons; Days of Our Lives)

Head writing tenure

References

External links

Living people
American soap opera writers
American women television writers
Women soap opera writers
Year of birth missing (living people)
People from Indiana
Daytime Emmy Award winners
Writers Guild of America Award winners
21st-century American women